Gudihathnur is a village and a Mandal in Adilabad district in the state of Telangana in India It is 20KM long from Adilabad. By NH7 Road.

References 

Mandals in Adilabad district